The Saumur International Festival of Military Bands is a bi-annual event organized in the French city of Saumur by the Standing Committee of City Celebrations. The festival acts as a military tattoo, bringing military bands from the French Armed Forces and foreign countries. In 1985, it was conceived to switch the annual flower parade in the city with a festival of military music. Placed under the patronage of the French and foreign authorities (both in the civil and military sphere) the festival has since invited many countries since its creation. It usually takes place over the course of one weekend in the summer.

Notable participants
French Foreign Legion Music Band (MLE) (2015)
Musique de l'Arme Blindée Cavalerie
United Arab Emirates Armed Forces
Gardemusik Wien
Prince’s Band of Carabiniers
Band of The 1st Brigade Cork
Symphonic Band and Chorus of the Secretariat of the Navy of Mexico

In 2019, Lieutenant Léa Nzoufa Nze from the Armed Forces of Gabon became the first woman to conduct a military band at the festival.

External links
 Comité des Fêtes de Saumur
 Office de Tourisme de Saumur
 Joyeux Festivaliers de Saumur

References

Recurring events established in 1985
Music festivals in France
Military tattoos
1985 establishments in France